Andrea Di Giovanni y Centellés (Messina, 3 February 1742 – Catania, 10 June 1821) was an Italian nobleman and lieutenant of the Order of Saint John from 1814 until his death.

Life
From a Spanish-origin noble family in Messina, Centellés officially entered the Order on 10 February 1750. Like his predecessor as lieutenant, Innico Maria Guevara-Suardo, his lieutenancy was marked by the problem of the sovereignty of Malta – on 30 May 1814 the Treaty of Paris between Russia, Britain, France and Prussia gave that sovereignty to Britain. Centellés immediately responded by sending delegates to the 1815  Congress of Vienna, where they presented the Order's legitimate reasons for claiming territorial possession of the island but were unable to win over the delegates. He sent ambassadors again in 1818, to the signing of the Treaty of Aix-la-Chapelle, but once more to no avail. On his death in 1821 Antonio Busca succeeded him as lieutenant of the Order.

Sources
  Francesco Giuseppe Terrinoni Memorie storiche della resa di Malta ai francesi nel 1798, tip. delle Belle Arti, Roma, 1867.

1742 births
1821 deaths
Lieutenants of the Knights Hospitaller